John Scammon (September 30, 1865 – April 8, 1940) was an American politician and lawyer who served as the President of the New Hampshire Senate and as an associate justice of the New Hampshire Superior Court.

Biography
Scammon was born September 30, 1865 in Stratham, New Hampshire.

On January 2, 1907 Scammon was elected as the President of the New Hampshire Senate. In 1931, he was president of the New Hampshire Bar Association.

Scammon died on April 8, 1940 in Keene, New Hampshire.

Notes

External links 
 Publications - Portraits of Legislators On State House Third Floor John Scammon

1865 births
1940 deaths
Republican Party New Hampshire state senators
Presidents of the New Hampshire Senate
American Congregationalists